The Canadair CL-44 was a Canadian turboprop airliner and cargo aircraft based on the Bristol Britannia that was developed and produced by Canadair in the late 1950s and early 1960s. Although innovative, only a small number of the aircraft were produced for the Royal Canadian Air Force (RCAF) (as the CC-106 Yukon), and for commercial operators worldwide.

The aircraft is named after the Canadian territory of Yukon.

Design and development
In the 1950s, Canadair acquired a licence to build the Bristol Britannia airliner. Their first use of it was to build the heavily modified Canadair CL-28 Argus patrol aircraft (RCAF designation CP-107) that combined the Britannia's wings and tail sections with a new fuselage and engines. The resulting aircraft had lower speed and service ceiling, but it had two bomb bays and greatly extended loiter times.

The RCAF required a replacement for its C-54GM North Star, itself an extensive redesign of the Douglas C-54 Skymaster. Among many changes, the proposed new aircraft was powered by Merlin engines. Canadair began work on a long range transport primarily intended to provide personnel and logistics support for Canadian Forces in Europe. In January 1957 Canadair received a contract for eight aircraft, later increased to 12. The RCAF designation for the new design was CC-106 Yukon, while the company's civilian variant was known as the CL-44-6. In company parlance the CL-44 was simply "the Forty-Four."

The RCAF specified the CL-44 to be equipped with Bristol Orion engines. When the British Ministry of Supply canceled the Orion program, the RCAF revised the specifications to substitute the Rolls-Royce Tyne 11. The CL-44 fuselage was lengthened, making it 12 ft 4 in (3.75 m) longer than the Britannia 300 with two large cargo doors added on the port side on some aircraft, while the cabin was pressurised to maintain a cabin altitude of 2,400 m at 9,000 m (30,000 ft). The design used modified CL-28 wings and controls. The Yukon could accommodate 134 passengers and a crew of nine. In the casualty evacuation role, it could take 80 patients and a crew of 11.

The rollout of the Yukon was a near-disaster because the prototype could not be pushed out of the hangar since the vertical fin could not clear the hangar doors. The first flight took place 15 November 1959 at Cartierville Airport. During test flights many problems were encountered, from complete electrical failure to engines shaking loose and almost falling off. Rolls-Royce had problems delivering engines, resulting in the sarcastically-named "Yukon gliders" being parked outside Canadair as late as 1961.

Operational history

Initially, the CL-44-6 was produced for the RCAF as the CC-106 Yukon. Once initial problems were resolved, in RCAF service the Yukon performed well and in December 1961, a Yukon set a world record for its class when it flew 6,750 mi (10,860 km) from Tokyo to RCAF Station Trenton, Ontario, in 17 hours, three minutes at an average speed of 400 mph (640 km/h). Later, a Yukon set a new record staying airborne for 23 hours and 51 minutes. These records were unbroken until bettered by the Boeing 747SP in 1975. By the time of their retirement, Yukons had flown 65 million miles, 1.5 billion passenger miles and 360 million ton-miles.

The CL-44D4 was briefly considered for purchase by the United States Air Force in the 1960s but the project was never culminated due to political backlash in Canada and the United States. The USAF purchase of the CL-44 was complicated by two factors. It came in the aftermath of the cancellation of the Avro Canada CF-105 Arrow and involved a "swap deal" wherein 100 McDonnell F-101 Voodoo fighters were obtained in return for a contract for 232 CL-44-D4 transports for the Military Air Transport Service (MATS). The political controversy that resulted led to problems for a Quebec-based company receiving a contract so soon after an Ontario-based company had lost a major contract. The USAF also quickly found that buying a foreign aircraft was not easy when American companies wanted the business and they relinquished the contract to Canadair, awarding an order to Boeing for the KC-135 Stratotanker.

On the cargo aircraft variant CL-44D4 the entire tail section hinged. It could be opened using hydraulic actuators to load large items quickly. An inflatable seal at the hinge-break enabled cabin pressure to be maintained, and eight hydraulic-operated locks assured structural integrity. The tail could be opened from controls within the tail in 90 seconds. The flight controls at the joint were maintained by a system of push pads.

The CL-44D4 was the first large aircraft to be able to "swing" its tail, although some small naval aircraft had this feature to ease storage. These, however, required rigging before flight. There were only four original customers who bought and operated the CL-44D4.

Loftleiðir was the only passenger operator of the CL-44J, variant of CL-44D4 stretched on request by Canadair. It was the largest passenger aircraft flying over the Atlantic Ocean at that time. Loftleiðir marketed the CL-44J under the name "Rolls-Royce 400 PropJet". This led to the confusion that the CL-44J is sometimes referred to as the Canadair-400. Loftleiðir Icelandic Airlines merged with Air Iceland in 1973 and became today's Icelandair.

In 1981 a Baku, Azerbaijan-based Soviet Union interceptor deliberately rammed an Argentine Canadair CL-44 from Transporte Aéreo Rioplatense, killing the three Argentines and one Briton on board; the aircraft was delivering arms from Israel to Iran (the Soviet pilot ejected and survived).

The CC-106 Yukons retired in March 1971 and were replaced by the Boeing 707 (CC-137). The Yukons might have served longer with the Canadian Forces Air Transport Command  but for two factors: the need for an aircraft which could operate as an in-flight refueling tanker, and the chronic shortage and high cost of spares, the latter resulting because the CL-44 had never gone into large-scale production. All Yukons were sold to South American and African operators as they could not be registered in Northern America or Europe since the FAA refused to certify the original windshields which came from the Bristol Britannia because they did not meet flight crew vision standards. The General Dynamics CV880/990 windshields were compatible enough to be adopted into the flight deck structure, but the cost was prohibitive. The CC-106 had the original Bristol Britannia windshield and, on its retirement from RCAF operations, the cost of conversion was estimated at $250,000.00 per unit, cost alone precluding its use in North America and Europe. In 1974, a special exclusion was granted for the CC-106 (Cargo) for civil operations in Canada.

Variants
CL-44-6
Version built for the Royal Canadian Air Force as the CC-106 Yukon, 12 built
CL-44D4-1
Civil, commercial cargo aircraft, civil prototype and production aircraft for Seaboard World Airlines, eight built.
CL-44D4-2
Civil, commercial cargo aircraft originally built for Flying Tiger Line, 13 built.
CL-44D4-6
Civil, commercial cargo aircraft originally built for Slick Airways, four built.
CL-44D4-8
Civil aircraft  for Icelandic Airlines Loftleidir, two built (civil passenger version)
CL-44J
Four CL-44D4 aircraft stretched by Canadair on request of Icelandic Airlines Loftleiðir, with a section, 10 ft 1 in (3.07 m) forward of the wing, and another section of 5 ft 1 in (1.55 m) aft of the wing. This enabled the installation of 29 extra seats, bringing the capacity to 189 passengers. The maximum take-off weight stayed the same since the extra weight was compensated by removing the center wing tanks. Therefore, it can be said that the stretch was a trade of capacity for range.
CL-44-O
Also known as the Skymonster and CL-44 Guppy. The CL-44-O was a single CL-44D4-2 (c/n 16) converted by Conroy Aircraft, who removed the fuselage shell above the floorline, and rebuilt an enlarged fuselage to make it into a Guppy-type aircraft. It was intended to transport Rolls-Royce RB211 engine pods to the United States for Lockheed's L-1011 TriStar.

Operators

Civilian operators

Four original customers who bought and operated the CL-44D4 were: Seaboard World Airlines, The Flying Tiger Line, Slick Airways and the Icelandic Airlines Loftleiðir. All other operators operated second-hand aircraft.

♠ original operators

 Transporte Aéreo Rioplatense
 Aerotransportes Entre Ríos

 HeavyLift Cargo Airlines was one of the operators of the CL-44 Guppy.

 Young Cargo

 Beaver Enterprises (dealer purchased CC-106s from the RCAF)

 Aerocondor Colombia (bought one CL-44-6 in 1974)
 AeroNorte Colombia (now Líneas Aéreas Suramericanas) (bought one CL-44J in 1984)
 Tampa Cargo
 SAEP Colombia

 Cyprus Airways (leased one CL-44D4-1 1978–1980)

 AECA Carga operated CL-44D-4-1
 Andes Airlines

 TACA International Airlines (one CL-44-6 leased in 1974)

 Skymaster Freight Services

 SOACO

 Bayu Indonesian Air

 Loftleiðir ♠ 

 Aer Turas

 Trans Mediterranean Airways (leased)

 United African Airlines later became Jamahiriya Air Transport

 Cargolux

 Royal Air Maroc(one aircraft leased in 1980)

 Aeronaves de Peru

 Cargosur

 Transvalair operated two aircraft.

 BOAC operated a transatlantic cargo service (London-Manchester-New York) with an aircraft leased from Seaboard World Airlines from 1963 until 1965.
 British Cargo Airlines
 British Air Ferries
 Redcoat Air Cargo
 Transmeridian Air Cargo operated total eight CL-44 including Guppy aircraft.

 Aeron International Airlines
 Air Express International
 Airlift International
 Cargosur
 The Flying Tiger Line ♠ 
 Seaboard World Airlines ♠ 
 Slick Airways ♠ 
 Tradewinds Airlines
 Wrangler Aviation

 Aero Uruguay
 Atlantida Linea Aérea Sudamericana (ALAS)

 Societé Générale d'Alimentation (SGA) (three CL-44-6s from 1973)
 Tramaco
 Vic Air Cargo later Virunga Air Cargo

Military operators

 Royal Canadian Air Force ♠
 No. 412 Squadron RCAF used two aircraft  as VIP transports.
 No. 426 Squadron RCAF
 No. 436 Squadron RCAF
 No. 437 Squadron RCAF received 11 Yukons with two as aerial tankers.
 No. 4 (Transport) Operational Training Unit RCAF
 Canadian Forces

Accidents and incidents

The Canadair CL-44 suffered 21 hull loss incidents during its operational history including the following:

 21 March 1966: N453T, Flying Tiger Line, crashed upon landing at NAS Norfolk, Virginia due to crew inexperience.
 24 December 1966: While trying to land in heavy fog on Da Nang International Airport, a Flying Tiger Line CL-44 crashed into the village of Binh Thai, killing all four crew on board and 107 people on the ground.
 2 December 1970: TF-LLG Cargolux Airlines S.A. crashed on approach to Dacca when controls lock system engaged.
 20 July 1972:  LV-JYR, Aerotransportes Entre Rios – AER disappeared on a cargo flight from Carrasco International Airport, Montevideo, Uruguay to Santiago, Chile, with the loss of five crew members.
 22 December 1974: G-AWSC, Tradewinds Airways, written off following damage in hard landing at Lusaka, Zambia
 2 September 1977: G-ATZH crashed into sea while attempting emergency landing after an engine fire spread to the wing after take off from Hong Kong Kai Tak airport, all four crew were killed.
 6 July 1978: G-BCWJ, Tradewinds Airways, written off after damage caused when main gear retracted after hard landing in Nairobi, Kenya.
 4 November 1980: 5B-DAN, Cyprus Airways, damaged beyond repair in after an emergency landing at RAF Akrotiri, Cyprus.
 18 July 1981: 1981 Armenia mid-air collision with a Soviet Sukhoi Su-15, leading to death of 3 crew and 1 passenger
 6 April 1986: HK-3148X of Lineas Aereas Suramericanas, Colombia crashed upon approach to Baranquilla, Colombia
 14 April 2000: 3C-ZPO was damaged beyond economic repair when ammunition caught fire while on ground in Kinshasa

Surviving aircraft
One CC-106 is known to have been preserved. The fuselage of construction number 13, last registered as HC-AZH, has been converted into a nightclub in Cuenca, Ecuador.

Additionally, the single CL-44-O Skymonster remains extant at Bournemouth Airport in the United Kingdom.

Specifications CL-44D-4

See also

References

Notes

Bibliography

 "Canadair CL-44." Flight, December 1958.
 Eastwood, Tony and John Roach. Turbo Prop Airliner Production List. West Drayton, UK: Aviation Hobby Shop, 1990. .
 Milberry, Larry. The Canadair North Star. Toronto: CANAV Books, 1982. .
 Oberg, James. Uncovering Soviet Disasters: Exploring the Limits of Glasnost. New York: Random House, 1988. .
 Pickler, Ron and Larry Milberry. Canadair: The First 50 Years. Toronto: CANAV Books, 1995. .

External links

 Information on all 39 CL-44s produced.
 DND – Canada's Air Force – The Canadair CC-106 Yukon
 Detailed listing of all CL-44 accidents
 "Canadair CL-44" a 1958 Flight article

CL-044
1950s Canadian cargo aircraft
Four-engined tractor aircraft
1950s Canadian military transport aircraft
Four-engined turboprop aircraft
Low-wing aircraft
Aircraft first flown in 1959